The Mississauga Chargers are a Junior "A" ice hockey team from Mississauga, Ontario, Canada.  They are a part of the Ontario Junior A Hockey League.  They are the product of a 1990 merger of two former Metro Junior B franchises, the Thornhill Thunderbirds and the Markham Connection.  After the 1990 merger the team spent one year in Markham known as the Markham Thunderbirds, and in 1991 they returned to their Thornhill Thunderbirds name for one season.  In 1992, the team moved to Mississauga.  As a member of the Metro Junior A Hockey League they participated for 3 seasons.  They left for the OPJHL in 1995. They have had a glim past few years, but in the 2007–08 season they saw a rare light when team captain Bruce Crawford lead the entire OPJHL in scoring (41-57-98).

History

Richmond Hill/Thornhill franchise
This franchise had begun in 1981 as the Weston Dukes, becoming the King City Dukes in 1984, and becoming the Richmond Hill Dukes in 1987 for one season.  The team moved to Thornill in 1988, and was named the Thunderbirds for two seasons before the merger.

Markham Travelways/Connection franchise
In 1983 the North York Flames moved to Markham, and were named as the Travelways.  In 1989 they were renamed the Markham Connection after the Travelways bus sponsor was sold.

Season-by-season results

The Thornhill franchise

Playoffs
1990 Won League
Thornhill Thunderbirds defeated Bramalea Blues 4-games-to-2
Thornhill Thunderbirds defeated Henry Carr Crusaders 4-games-to-2
Thornhill Thunderbirds defeated Wexford Raiders 4-games-to-3 METJHL CHAMPIONS
1991 Lost Preliminary
Kingston Voyageurs defeated Markham Thunderbirds 2-games-to-1
1992 Lost Semi-final
Thornhill Thunderbirds defeated Pickering Panthers 4-games-to-none
Wexford Raiders defeated Thornhill Thunderbirds 4-games-to-2
1993 Lost Quarter-final
St. Michael's Buzzers defeated Mississauga Senators 4-games-to-2
1994 DNQ
1995 Lost Quarter-final
Caledon Canadians defeated Mississauga Chargers 4-games-to-none

Markham Travelways/Connections franchise

1990 Lost Preliminary
Oshawa Legionaires defeated Markham Connections 3-games-to-none

Notable alumni
Adam Graves
Curtis Joseph
Manny Legace
Jamal Mayers
Jeff O’Neill
Mark Popovic
Kyle Quincey
Nick Paul
Anthony Cirelli

Other Mississauga teams
Before the Chargers, the Mississauga Torspos played in the Metro Junior B league from 1985 until 1988.  Also, in 1992, the Central Junior "B" league Streetsville Derbys were known as the Mississauga Derbys for the 1992–93 season, before retaining their original name.

External links
Chargers Webpage

Ontario Provincial Junior A Hockey League teams
Sport in Mississauga